Tanokin Trio (たのきんトリオ) was a Japanese group, composed of three Johnny's idols, Toshihiko Tahara (Toshi), Nomura Yoshio (Yoshi), Masahiko Kondo (Matchy). It was active for a short period in the early 1980s (dissolved on 28 August 1983), they became icons among young people of their generation. All three appeared as students in the first series of Kinpachi-sensei.

Members

Major casting works

Television
Kinpachi-sensei (TBS)
The first series (October 26, 1979 - March 28, 1980)
The second series, episode 13 (December 26, 1980)
Special 1 (October 8, 1982)
Special 3 (October 5, 1984)
Tadaima Hokago (ただいま放課後) (May 26 - September 19, 1980, Fuji TV)
幕末花の美剣士たち (January 4, 1981, TV Tokyo)

Variety
Tanokin Zenryoku Tokyu (たのきん全力投球!) (October 9, 1980 - March 27, 1983, TBS)

Film

Tanokin Super Hit Series
Graffiti Youth: Sneaker Blues (February 11, 1981)
Blue Jeans Memory (July 11, 1981)
Good Luck Love (December 20, 1981)
Highteen Boogie (August 7, 1982)
The Mysterious Gemini • Y&S (December 11, 1982)
Heart Beat (August 4, 1983)

Stage
サヨナラ日劇FESTIVAL (February 11, 1981, Japan Theater)
たのきんスーパースリー 　桜島野外コンサート  (typhoon in March 1981, canceled)
たのきん3球コンサート (August 1981, August 1983)

Songs
君に贈る言葉 （アフター・スクール） (B side of Toshihiko Tahara's "Sorrowful Heart")
ときめきはテレパシー (insert in the movie Good Luck Love)

Video
たのきんHOTライブ (November 5, 1980, Pony Canyon)
3球コンサート 1983・8・28 大阪スタヂアム (1983)

Cassette tape & photo collection
Takenokin Live '81 (July 8, 1981, Shueisha)
Side A
哀愁メドレー（哀愁でいと～レッツゴー・ダンシング～ファンキー・モンキー・ベイビー～ルイジアナママ～哀愁トゥ・ナイト～哀愁でいと）
スニーカーぶる～す
月の灯り
ある日曜日の出来事
Rockn Rollメドレー（恋のゴーカート～悲しき雨音～ハッピーバースデースウィート16～ダイアナ）
Side B
コール・ミー
雨が降ってきた
ラストダンスは私と
しらけちまうぜ
ハッとして Good!
ヨコハマ・チーク
恋はDo！
君にこのうたを

Awards and nominations

|-
| 1980
| 18th Golden Arrow Award
| Popularity Award
| Tanokin Trio
| 
| 
|-
| 1982
| 20th Golden Arrow Award
| Super Idol Award
| Tanokin Trio
| 
|

References

External links 
 Tanokin Trio

Japanese pop music groups
Johnny & Associates
Japanese idol groups
Japanese boy bands
Musical groups disestablished in 1983